The European qualification for the 2019 World Men's Handball Championship, in Denmark and Germany, was contested in two rounds among the teams that did not qualify for the 2018 European Men's Handball Championship and the 12 teams that did play this tournament but was not already qualified and failed to qualify through it.

In the first round of qualification, 23 teams not participating at the European Championship were split into six groups; the group winners advanced to the second round, joining the 12 European finalists not already qualified for the 2019 World Championships (Denmark and Germany has qualified as hosts, France has qualified as defending champions and Spain has qualified as the European Champion). These 18 teams then were paired to play a two-legged playoff tie to determine the nine remaining World Championship qualifiers from Europe.

Qualification stage 1
All times are local.

Group 1

Group 2
The group was played in a tournament format.

Group 3
The group was played in a tournament format.

Group 4
The group was played in a tournament format.

Group 5

Group 6

 Bosnia Herzegovina won the game 21–15, but an ineligible player took part in the match. Switzerland launched a protest after the game. The EHF accepted the protest and the result of the match was awarded 10–0 in favour of Switzerland.

Qualification stage 2
The draw took place on 27 January at 16:00 in Zagreb, Croatia. All stage 1 winners and three worst placed teams from European Championship were unseeded at the draw.

Draw

Notes

Overview
The first legs were played on 8 to 10 June and the second legs on 12 to 14 June 2018.

|}

Matches

Serbia won 53–46 on aggregate.

Iceland won 61–58 on aggregate.

Russia won 55–48 on aggregate.

Hungary won 51–50 on aggregate.

Austria won 59–54 on aggregate.

Macedonia won 57–50 on aggregate.

Sweden won 50–45 on aggregate.

Norway won 62–59 on aggregate.

Croatia won 63–51 on aggregate.

References

External links
Eurohandball.com 

2017 in handball
2018 in handball
World Handball Championship tournaments
Qualification for handball competitions